Arnold Vivian Cooke (born 13 April 1941) is a retired Welsh born, British rower who competed in the 1964 Olympics.

Rowing career
Cooke rowed in the boat race in 1963 for CUBC

Cooke was selected to compete for Great Britain in the 1964 Olympics in Tokyo. He rowed with Peter Webb in the men's double sculls, finishing in seventh place. He won a silver medal in the 1964 European Rowing Championships. Two years later in 1966 represented Britain again at the 1966 World Rowing Championships but this time partnering Nick Cooper in the double sculls, they finished in 9th place overall after a third place finish in the B final.

Cooke is the president of the Minerva Bath Rowing Club.

References

External links 
 

1941 births
Living people
British male rowers
Rowers at the 1964 Summer Olympics
Olympic rowers of Great Britain
European Rowing Championships medalists